Man from Guangdong is a 1991 Hong Kong martial arts television series produced by TVB and tells the story of  Leung Kan, portrayed by Aaron Kwok, the fictitious son of famed martial artist Leung Foon, whom was a favored disciple of folk hero Wong Fei-hung, portrayed by Shih Kien. Shih, who portrayed Wong in the series, was known for portraying antagonists in a series of Wong Fei-hung-related films during the 1940s to 1970s, while the series also features Sai Gwa-Pau reprising his role as "Buckteeth So" from the aforementioned series of films.

Plot
Wong Fei-hung (Shih Kien), one of the Ten Tigers of Canton, has passed his prime and decides to close down his martial arts school and clinic, Po Chi Lam. His disciples has scattered to different places and Wong himself decides to retire to Foshan and no longer wants to be involved in the martial world. One while, while playing chess with Kwan Yan-kin (Cheng Gwan-min), they mention Wong's favored disciple, Leung Foon, lamenting his premature death. According to rumors, Leung has descendants that are living. Wong then send his disciple Buckteeth So's (Sai Gwa-Pau) daughter, So Siu-mui (Wu Man-yam) to find the whereabouts that descendant, hoping to teach him his skills and revive the former prestige of Po Chi Lam. Leung Foon had a naturally upright personality and never indulged in romance, but during one night when he got drunk, he had a one-night stand with a showgirl named Koo Kam-fung (Pak Yan). Not long after, Leung was brutally killed by rivals, leaving Kam-fung heartbroken. The pregnant Kam-fung returns to her ancestral home, leaving all her glory behind, and gives birth to her child. As the years flow by, Kam-fung's son, Leung Kan (Aaron Kwok), has grown up and works as a pig breeder for a living. Due to his mother's background, Kan was often given cold stares and ridiculed by others. Kan aspires to make it out to the province one day and study under his grandmaster, Wong Fei-hung, hoping to wash out his past shame. On the other hand, one of Kan's fellow disciples, Law Kam-loi (Gary Chan), who came from a wealthy family, is often bullied by other disciples. Kam-loi is like-minded with Kan and never looked-down upon Kan's background and they develop a brotherly friendship. Kam-loi's father, Law Pak-man (Tin Ching), has prearranged his son to marry with village leader Koo Tin-ho's (Sing Yan) daughter, Ku Yuet-fan (Chan On-ying). However, Yuet-fan has an unruly pungent personality and Kam-loi is disinterested in her so he makes up many excuses to stall the marriage.

Cast
Aaron Kwok as Leung Kan (梁謹)
Wu Man-yam as So Siu-mui (蘇小妹)
Tang Tai-wo as Messenger
Shih Kien as Wong Fei-hung (黃飛鴻)
Cheng Gwan-min as Kwan Yan-kin (關仁堅)
Sai Gwa-Pau as Buckteeth So (牙擦蘇)
Ma Siu-fu as Tai-kau Sui (大舊水)
Chan Chi-ho as Sui's underling
Leung Chun-kit as Sui's underling
Penny Leung as Sui's underling
Leung Ka-kit as Sui's underling
Pak Yan as Koo Kam-fung (古金鳳)
Gary Chan as Law Kam-loi (羅金來)
Chan On-ying as Koo Yuet-fan (古月芬)
Tin Ching as Law Pak-man (羅百萬)
Leung Po-ching as Wet Nurse Tai (戴奶媽)
William Chu as Village kid
Mui Lan as Farmer lady
Hau Wai-wan as Widow Chan (陳寡婦)
Chan Fung-ping as Granny Wong (王婆)
Chu Wai-ming as Village kid
Sing Yan as Koo Tin-ho (古天河)
Chan Kin-tak as Thief
Au Yuk as Owner
Lee Siu-kei as Ching-chik (正直)
Wong Man-piu as Waiter #2
Pang Chun-fai as Waiter #3
Mak Siu-wah as Mountain thief
Chung King-po as Mountain thief
Lai Sau-ying as Tea-selling old lady
Chow Woon-yin as Old man
Wong Wai-lam as Passerby
Yeung Ka-fai as Passerby
Kwok Chi-kwan as Passerby
Gregory Charles Rivers as Priest
Joanna Chan as Yu-yee (如意)
Lau Chiu-fan as Ping (炳)
Mui Chi-ching as Passerby
Ho Chi-ching as Passerby
Ho Pak-kwong as Hoi-fuk (海福)
Mak Chi-wan as Keung (阿強)
Cheng Lui as Airplane Cheung (飛機祥)
Ma Siu-mang as Tenant
Chan Min-leung as Fairy Choi (賽神仙)
Wong Yat-fei as Second uncle Chan (陳二叔)
Suen Kwai-hing as Old man Lam (林伯)
Wong Kin-fung as Cheung (阿章)
Tang Yuk-wing as Western shop owner
Kwong Cho-fai as Western shop employee
Cheung Siu as Western shop customer
Lily Leung as Auntie Lan (蘭姨)
Cheng Wai-ka as Yim-mui (艷梅)
Wong Fung-king as Po-fong (寶芳)
Teresa Ha as Yee-wan (綺雲)
Leung Oi as Mei-mei (薇薇)
Tsang Yiu-ming as Brothel boat customer
Cheung Pak-yin as Brothel boat customer
Lee Hoi-sang as Ha Hon-yan (哈漢仁)
Siu San-yan as Adviser Chow (周師爺)
Leung Siu-chau as Pau (阿豹)
Kenny Wong as Piu (阿彪)
Chan Yau-hau as 13th Master (十三少)
Yu Ming as 8th Master (八少)
Ma Kin-chung as Beggar #1
Daniel Kwok as Beggar #2
Tang Yee-ho as Innkeeper
Chan Hon-keung as Fighter
Tang Kai-wing as Fighter
Cheng Chong-wai as Pier worker
Lee Hon-sing as Fighter
Leung Yam-kei as Ha Tai-yung (哈大勇)
Yung Kai-lai as Waitress
Mok Yin-seung as Waitress
Carrie Ho as Siu Kuen-kuen (小娟娟)
Ling Hon as Uncle Choi (財叔)
Elton Loo as Crazy Boy (白痴仔)
Wong Wah-sing as Theatre hawker
Yuen Hon-po as Clothes hawker
Yu Mo-lin as Crazy Boy's mother
Choi Wing-cheung as Brothel boat customer
Lee Lin-to as Brothel boat customer
Chan Kim-fai as Brothel boat customer
Lau Wai-kwok as Brothel boat customer
Lee Wai-man as Kong Mo Society disciple
Ho Chun-wah as Ha's underling
Tam Chun-wai as Rice shop employee
Ko Yin-fung as Rice shop employee / Po Chi Lam patient
Law Hung as Rice vault manager
Tong Ping-kwong as Noodle shop owner
Mak Shu-san as Cookie shop owner
Lee Wah-kon as Medicine shop owner
Wong Kin-san as Leprosy man (麻瘋佬)
Lee Lung-kei as Wong Chiu-mo (黃超武)
Lok Hung as Fat Dragon (肥龍)
Lee Hin-ming as Skinny Tiger (瘦虎)
Hui Chi-kai as Po Chi Lam disciple
Wan Tak-keung as Po Chi Lam disciple
Poon Shu-kei as Po Chi Lam patient
Cheung Siu as Po Chi Lam patient
Ma Yiu-seung as Fortune solver
Wong Sze-yan as Kong Mo Society disciple
Lee Wai-man as Kong Mo Society disciple
Tam Yat-ching as Gentleman
Kong Tak-wah as Beggar
Lau Wan as Pork Kwai (豬肉貴)
Pamela Peck as Yap Sam-neung (扈三娘)
Tang Yu-chiu as Waiter
Wong Sing-seung as Keeper
Kan Sui-chiu as Old man
Yip Sai-kuen as Luk (阿陸)
Chang Yi as Chuk Kwan (祝昆)
Yung Sau-yee as Farm lady
Chow Ngai-ming as Blade shop owner
Ng Sek-hing as Filthy passerby
Wong San as Host
Ng Sui-ting as Siu Sa-yee (小沙彌)
Tsui San-yee as Fake Fairy Choi (假賽神仙)
Kong Ngai as Grandpa (公公)
Ho Man-chun as Clothes shop owner
Chung Wai-tung as Passerby
Cheung Kwok-keung as Passerby
Tsang Kan-wing as Woodman
Bowie Wu as Clubfoot Seven (腳七)
Liu Lai-lai as Terre woman
Yau Kit-ping as Terre woman
Chan Yuk-ping as Terre woman
Yu Feng as Brothel madam
Chan Siu-leung as Sweet soup hawker
Ho Kwok-ying as Bear fruit hawker
Chan Yin-hong as Prostitute #1
Fong Wai-kei as Prostitute #2
Chan Wai-yu as Mang Po (孟婆)
Mak Siu-wah as Strong man
Lau Kwai-fong as Village woman
Ling Lai-man as Fellow Chan (陳父老)
Lau Siu-cheung as Storyteller
Hau Chun-yu as Street kid
Lai Yuen-san as Street kid
Ho Pik-kin as Fortune solver
Au Chi-ho as Passerby
Chan Kam-man as Strong man
Cheng Chi as Strong man
Choi Woon-yiu as Strong man
Chow Ngai-ming as Keeper
Chow Sai-leung as Strong man
Fung Chi-kin as Strong man
Chan Hon-man as Strong man
Wong Kin-fung as Cheung (阿章)
Shek Wan as Proprietor
Leung Lok-yee as Yuk (玉)
Fung Sui-chun as Yuk's mother 
Helen Ma as Single-eyed Ying (單眼英)
Wong Wai-lam as Mobster #1
Wong Wai-leung as Mobster #2
Au Chi-hung as 2nd Master (二爺)
Nishikawa Chiaki as Young girl
Lam Wah-fan as Villager
Hui Cheung-lung as Villager
Leung Hung as Congee shop owner
Hui Kin-shun as Old Yung (老翁)
Hakusan Yukiko as Young girl
Wu Fong-ling as Matchmaker
Lui Kim-kwong as Elderly Mr. Chan (陳老爺)
Luk Ying-hong as Cheung (阿祥)
Fong Kit as Ching (阿正)

See also
Aaron Kwok filmography
Wong Fei-hung filmography
List of TVB series (1991)

External links
Man from Guangdong at MyTV
Man from Guangdong at Douban

1991 Hong Kong television series debuts
1991 Hong Kong television series endings
TVB dramas
Hong Kong action television series
Martial arts television series
Period television series
Serial drama television series
Television series set in the Qing dynasty
1990s Hong Kong television series
Cantonese-language television shows